Klaus Gerhart is an American photographer and the owner of Uber Adventures, the largest canyoneering training provider in the U.S. He was the owner of Pohlmann Press and the owner and curator of the N Gallery art gallery.

Life
Born Klaus Gerhart in Illinois in 1965, Gerhart grew up there before moving to Chicago in 1992. He built a photography studio there, but moved to Los Angeles in 1994. He founded Pohlmann Press that same year, and began publishing the work of photographers of the male nude. Among the works the press carried were his own.

Pohlmann Press quickly became one of the largest American publishers of nude male photography. The company published the work of Lorenzo Gomez, Roy Dean, David Vance, Christopher Makos, Joe Ziolkowski, John Phillips, Catherine McIntyre, Nina Glaser, Patrick Sarfati, Dale O'Dell and Chuck Smith, and focused on Gerhart's own work. Pohlmann Press also handled American subscriptions to (not only) blue magazine, an upscale Australian bimonthly magazine of photography which also featured male nudes and semi-nudes.

In 1995, Gerhart created the Naked Gallery—an art gallery but also a publisher of a catalog that specializes in the works of Pohlmann Press, artistic male and female nude imagery, books, calendars, lithographs, and original signed limited edition photographic prints.

Art
Between 1995 and 1998, Gerhart published two books: Embracing Men and Men Two. Both books contained about 100 photographs, indicating a very busy photographic schedule. In 1997, Gerhart published Naked Angels. The book was extremely well received, and its cover image of a nude man's back and buttocks as he appears to dive off a rocky cliff became iconic.  The following year, the German publisher Bruno Gmuender issued a pocket-sized, hardcover collection of Gerhart's works titled Edition Euros 13. The same year, Gerhart published Handsome Devils.

But as Pohlmann Press expanded, Klaus Gerhart found less time for photography. Two years passed before Body Conscious (in 1999) was published. Echo followed a year later. Gerhart has not published any works since 2001. Pohlmann Press ceased publishing in 2001 as well.

Critical assessment
Gerhart is a self-taught photographer. Much of his early development as an artist came during a period when single-lens reflex cameras (SLRs) and cameras with automatic metering and focusing were uncommon. Consequently, Gerhart's photography exhibits the knowledge and skill levels of a manual photographer with a wide range of experience. His images often feature a wide range of grain, and he experiments extensively with exposure and fill lighting. Depth of field is an important aspect of his work, and soft focus is used only minimally. Compared with photographers who are more reliant on modern photographic technology, Gerhart's work exhibits a much wider range of artistry.

Gerhart's personal vision as a photographer, however, tends to be less expansive.

For example, Gerhart's models are rather uniform in look. Gerhart is clearly a fan of muscular, well-toned, handsome Caucasian men. Models of who are not very muscular and very well-toned also very rarely appear in his images.

Additionally, Gerhart seems overly fond of desert settings in his work. Gerhart has a fixation with cacti, sandstone rocks, waterfalls, deserts and similar settings. A standard motif which appears routinely and repetitively throughout his entire career is a model, flexing his muscles, standing on a sandstone boulder or rocky outcropping. Derisively known as the 'jocks on rocks' school of erotic male photography, these settings limit the range of emotion brought to the photography by both artist and model. While popular with the public, contexts such as these, repetitively used, detract significantly from the impact of Gerhart's work. In this regard, however, Gerhart is in good company: Highly regarded photographers such as Herb Ritts, Tom Bianchi, Steven Underhill, Henning von Berg, Bruce Weber and others also overutilize such settings.

Despite these criticisms, Klaus Gerhart nevertheless manages to retain an edginess in his artwork.

Gerhart's work indicates a willingness to challenge social norms and prevailing notions of taste in stronger terms than many of the more tame, if more mainstream, photographers with whom he is often compared.

The overall assessment of Gerhart's work, then, is that it is technically superior. While his work often shows a lack of visual artistry, even a mundaneness, his art retains a transgressive aspect that is refreshing and helps lift his work above the commonplace.

Notes

Books by Klaus Gerhart
 Embracing Men, Pohlmann Press, Los Angeles, 1995, 
 Men Two, Pohlmann Press, Los Angeles, 1995, 
 Naked Angels, Pohlmann Press, Los Angeles, 1997, 
 Edition Euros 13, Bruno Gmuender Verlag, Berlin, 1998, 
 Handsome Devils, Pohlmann Press, Los Angeles, 1998, 
 Body Conscious, Pohlmann Press, Los Angeles, 1999, 
 Echo, Pohlmann Press, Los Angeles, 2001,

References
 'About the author.' Naked Angels., Pohlmann Press, Los Angeles, 1997, 
 Mader, Don H. 'Klaus Gerhart.' Edition Euros 13, Bruno Gmuender Verlag, Berlin, 1998, 

http://uberadventures.net/team/

American photographers
1965 births
Living people